Patrick Lee is an American author. He has written six novels. His first three books comprise a trilogy centered on Travis Chase, an ex-convict who becomes involved in events surrounding alien technology on Earth. His most recent three books feature a protagonist named Sam Dryden, a former soldier who encounters high-tech problems that border on the supernatural.

Lee's first book, The Breach, was chosen for IndieBound's Indie Next List in January 2010, and reached USA Today's bestseller list the same month.

Bibliography

Travis Chase series
 The Breach
 Ghost Country
 Deep Sky

Sam Dryden series
 Runner
 Signal
Dark Site

References

External links
 Official Site
 Profile at HarperCollins Website
 Profile at Macmillan Website

Living people
1976 births
21st-century American novelists
American male novelists
21st-century American male writers